Luu Meng (born on 7 February 1974) is a Chinese Cambodian chef, culinary author and hospitality entrepreneur. He is the CEO of Almond Group, director of Thalias Group, president of the Cambodia Tourism Federation, president of Cambodian Hotel Association, president of Cambodia Chef Federation, vice president of ASEAN Hotel Association and Cuisine Advisor of the Confrérie de la Chaîne des Rôtisseurs.

Biography 
Luu Meng was born in 1974 in Phnom Penh, Cambodia. At the age of three his family was forced to relocate to a U.N. operated refugee camp in Thailand where Meng grew up as the oldest of three. His family survived the Khmer Rouge period by following Meng's grandfather's advice to stay near the water. His grandfather had previously fled Mao Zedong's regime in China and settled in Phnom Penh with his family, where he had sold clocks and watches at the Central Market. Meng's mother Diep Cheang had run a famous banh chao shop on Sothearos Boulevard and his grandmother worked as a cook in the Royal Palace kitchens and operated a restaurant before the Khmer Rouge.

In the early 1980s, when Meng was eight years old, his family returned to Phnom Penh and purchased a house near Orussey Market. Meng attended the Chinese Tong Hoa School. In 1993 he started working at the Sofitel Cambodiana as a trainee cook, becoming a sous chef in 1995. At Cambodiana Meng met his future business partner Arnaud Darc who worked there as a cost controller. Later Meng worked as an executive chef for the Sunway Hotel. In 2001 he worked for Sofitel in Siem Reap for a year and then returned to Siem Reap, where Meng worked with Darc's restaurant "Topaz". In 2004 together with Darc he opened "Malis", the first Cambodian fine dining restaurant in Phnom Penh. To design the restaurant's menu Meng travelled throughout Cambodia for six months and collected traditional recipes, which he presented using farm-sourced ingredients and modern cooking techniques. 

On 8 August 2008 after two years of construction Meng opened the flagship Almond Hotel. The following year he opened the Yi Sang Chinese Restaurant at the Phnom Penh Special Economic Zone and in 2011 another Yi Sang Restaurant at Château on Phnom Penh's riverside. 2012 saw the publishing of the book "Cambodia’s Top Tables" co-written by Luu Meng and Siem Reap-based British food writer and journalist Clive Graham-Ranger featuring recipes from 52 restaurants in Cambodia. The same year Luu Meng was awarded the Order of Agricultural Merit by the French government for "his creation of Cambodian nouvelle cuisine and building a bridge to other culinary cultures".

In 2014 Meng received Asia's Top Chef award from the Malaysia-based business and lifestyle magazines "Top 10 of Malaysia" and "Top 10 of Asia". In 2016 he published the cookbook "Cambodia Sevensea's", which Meng wrote together with culinary writer Darren Gall, with Cambodian coastal recipes from Kampot, Kep, Sihanoukville and the islands.

In May 2021 Meng and other private donors partnered with Princess Norodom Arunrasmy's Muditha Foundation to provide food hampers to people in areas most affected by the COVID-19 pandemic in Cambodia.

Books
 Darren Gall, Luu Meng (2016). Cambodia Sevensea's. Sorse Hospitality 
 Clive Graham-Ranger, Luu Meng (2012). Cambodia's Top Tables.

References

External links 

 Luu Meng's personal website
 Luu Meng's YouTube channel
 Luu Meng, Malis, Siem Reap. Savour BlackBookAsia
 The Most Famous Chef in Cambodia . 29 June 2020. Frame Cambodia

1974 births
Cambodian people of Chinese descent
Cambodian chefs
Living people
Cambodian cookbook writers
Cambodian businesspeople
Officers of the Order of Agricultural Merit